Cigarette Girl is a 2009 film written and directed by Mike McCarthy and starring Cori Dials, Ivy McLemore, Helen Bowman, and Danny Vinson. The film premiered on July 10, 2009 at the Revelation Perth International Film Festival in Australia.

Plot
In the not too distant future, society has levied laws against smoking and forced citizens to live in a certain part of town called the "Smoking Section" if one wants to smoke cigarettes. After crossing the line into the smoking ghetto, cigarettes now cost $63.49 a pack, and are sold on the street corners and underground bars. The unnamed heroine (Cori Dials) of the film works in the "Vice Club", an abandoned 1930s era cigarette factory turned club.

After her grandmother (Helen Bowman) is hospitalized with emphysema, the Cigarette Girl attempts to break her addiction to nicotine while also escaping the clutches of her employers, the mob-associated operators of the Vice Club. Deciding to start carrying a pistol, the Cigarette Girl stops smoking and starts killing on the third day to alleviate her acute psychological withdrawal manifested primarily by the ghost of a cowboy who is always on her back to keep smoking.

Cast
 Cori Dials as The Cigarette Girl
 Helen Bowman as Grandma
 Ivy McLemore as Runaway
 Danny Venson as Cowboy
 D'Army Bailey as Store Owner
 James Buchanan as Johnny Valet
 Lynne Turley as Vice Boss
 J. Lazarus Hawk as Ace
 Donald Meyers as Doctor
 Christian B. Walker as Prophet/Dead Grass Boy #1
 Christopher Tyzhai Allen as Dead Grass Boy #2
 Markus Seaberry as Dead Grass Boy #3
 Emmy Collins as Suspicious Dude
 Lary Love Dolley as Hat Check Girl
 Daniel Lee as Customer
 Daniel Reed as Customer
 Glenn Payne as Customer
 Jacob Burcham as Customer

Promotion
 World Premiere: Revelation Perth International Film Festival, July 2–12, 2009 in Perth, Australia
 US Premiere: Malco Theatres' Studio on the Square, Sept. 10, 2009 in Memphis, TN. Promoted by a collaboration between the On-Location Memphis & Indie Memphis Film Festivals.

Reception
Variety said the film "is a hot low-budget mess, but fun." John Beifuss of The Commercial Appeal gave Cigarette Girl 3 1/2 out of 5 stars, calling it "signature McCarthy".

References

External links
 
 

2009 films
American drama films
Films about smoking
2000s English-language films
2000s American films